Pseudocharis is a genus of tiger moths in the family Erebidae. It was erected by Herbert Druce in 1884.

Species
Pseudocharis melanthus (Stoll, [1781])
Pseudocharis minima (Grote, 1867) – lesser wasp moth
Pseudocharis naenia H. Druce, 1884
Pseudocharis picta (Schaus, 1894)
Pseudocharis romani (Bryk, 1953)
Pseudocharis sanguiceps (Hampson, 1898)
Pseudocharis sithon H. Druce, 1884
Pseudocharis splendens (H. Druce, 1888)
Pseudocharis translucida Dognin, 1890
Pseudocharis trigutta (Walker, 1854)

References

Euchromiina
Moth genera